Caruth is an unincorporated community in Dunklin County, in the U.S. state of Missouri. 

The community is on Missouri Route Y approximately 6.5 miles south of Kennett and 3.5 miles east of Senath on Missouri Route P. The community of Cotton Plant is three miles south on Route Y.

History
The first settlement at Caruth was made in 1881. The founder gave the community the last name of a personal acquaintance, one Mr. Caruth, a businessman from St. Louis. A post office called Caruth was established in 1882, and remained in operation until 1913.

References

Unincorporated communities in Dunklin County, Missouri
Unincorporated communities in Missouri